Trinity Episcopal Church is a historic Episcopal church in Atchison, Kansas.

The church building was constructed in 1866. Aviator Amelia Earhart was baptized in the church in 1897 and attended the church as a child. She was born nearby in the Amelia Earhart Birthplace. The building was listed on the National Register of Historic Places in 1985.

References

External links
Official website

Churches on the National Register of Historic Places in Kansas
Episcopal church buildings in Kansas
Churches in Atchison, Kansas
National Register of Historic Places in Atchison County, Kansas